Matthew James Harrold (born 25 July 1984) is a former English professional footballer who played as a forward and is currently first team coach for  club Leyton Orient.

Harrold has had numerous previous clubs including Wycombe Wanderers, Southend United, Grays Athletic, Harlow Town, Brentford, Yeovil Town, Shrewsbury Town, Crawley Town and Leyton Orient as well as loan spells at Grimsby Town, Dagenham & Redbridge and Cambridge United.

Playing career

Early career
He is a former pupil of Trinity Catholic High School, Woodford Green, he was initially a product of Southend United's youth set-up, although he departed for non-league football and played at Grays Athletic, Wingate & Finchley and Harlow Town.

Brentford

2003–04 season
Brentford signed Harrold from Harlow Town in July 2003. He showed early promise in the 2003–04 season when he scored a hat-trick against non-league Gainsborough Trinity in the FA Cup, which made him the youngest-ever Brentford player to score a hat-trick. Later that season he also scored crucial goals in the league against Colchester United and future club Wycombe Wanderers to help Brentford to safety.

2004–05 season
The following season, 2004–05. he was loaned out twice. His first loan was to Dagenham & Redbridge in the Conference. He scored on his debut against Accrington Stanley but didn't score again in 3 more appearances for the club. Upon his return to Brentford he played as a substitute in their memorable 2–2 draw at Premier League side Southampton in the FA Cup fifth round. However shortly afterwards he was sent out on loan again, to Grimsby Town. He again scored on his debut, this time against Oxford United, and scored again in his second appearance against Boston United. However these would be his only 2 goals for the club and he returned to Brentford again to help in their promotion push. Brentford made it into the playoffs but lost in the semifinals to Sheffield Wednesday.

Yeovil Town
Harrold signed for Yeovil in 2005 for an undisclosed small fee. He was signed by manager Gary Johnson, but within months Johnson had left to become manager of Bristol City. However, Harrold went on to score 9 league goals in his only full season at the club. Highlights included a brace in a 4–3 win at Scunthorpe United and a goal against former club Brentford.

Southend United
Harrold joined Southend after a long-running summer transfer saga which ended with him being signed an hour before the transfer deadline on 31 August 2006. He scored his first goal for Southend against West Bromwich Albion on 16 September 2006. Over the next two seasons he only managed 5 further goals in all competitions.

Wycombe Wanderers

2008–09 season

Harrold joined Wycombe on 1 September 2008 on a free transfer on a two-year contract after being released by Southend. On 4 October 2008, he scored his first goal in a Wycombe shirt in a 3–1 home win over Bournemouth. On 10 November 2008, he went on to score his first hat trick for the club on 10 November in an FA Cup first round match against AFC Wimbledon, which Wycombe went on to win 4–1. 2 weeks later he netted 2 goals, which led to a 4–2 win over Port Vale. He added another goal to his tally a week later in a 2–0 win away at Notts County. On 20 December 2008, he scored the match winning goal for Wycombe away at Shrewsbury. 6 days later he netted Wycombes only goal in a 1–1 draw with Exeter City. 15-day later on 3 January 2009, he scored for Wycombe in 2–0 win over Bury. On 31 January 2009, he scored Wycombe's only goal of the match in a 3–1 loss away at Bournemouth. 7 Days later he scored an 80th-minute goal which won Wycombe's match against Accrington Stanley; this was the last goal Matt Harrold scored for Wycombe in the 2008–09 season.

2009–10 season
He scored his first goal for Wycombe in 2009–10 season in 1–1 draw against his former club Southend, on 18 August 2009. 4 days later he scored in Wycombe's 5–2 loss at Carrow Road.
Harrold was released by Wycombe on 11 May 2010, after the club's relegation to League Two.

Shrewsbury Town

2010–11 season
In July 2010, Harrold was on trial at Swedish Superettan club Örgryte IS, before joining Shrewsbury Town. On 10 August 2010, he scored his first goal for Shrewsbury in a 4–3 win over Charlton Athletic. On 21 August 2010, he was red carded in 1–1 draw against Aldershot after receiving his second yellow card. On 28 August 2010, Harrold scored a goal in the 4–0 rout against Stockport County.

Bristol Rovers

2011–12 season
Harrold signed for Bristol Rovers in June 2011, for an undisclosed fee on a two-year contract. He scored his first goal for the club on his debut against Wimbledon, in which they won 3–2. He scored his second goal of the season against in the 2–2 draw on 10 September 2011 against Bradford City. His first home goal won the game for Bristol Rovers against Northampton Town. He converted his first penalty in a 2–0 home win against Dagenham & Redbridge, on 29 October 2011. On 26 December 2011, he scored 2 first half goals in a home match against West Country rivals Plymouth Argyle, which rovers went on to lose 3–2 after leading 2–0 at half time. 5 days later he scored a goal in Bristol Rovers 5–2 loss against Crewe Alexandra at the Memorial Stadium. He went on a 5-game goal drought before scoring his next goal, which was scored against local rivals Torquay United. 10 days later he scored another goal against Plymouth Argyle at Home Park on 20 March 2012, which Rovers drew 1–1. On 14 April 2012, he added two more goals to his tally in 7–1 rout against Burton Albion, and another two in a 5–1 victory for Bristol Rovers at home to Accrington Stanley.

In his first season at Bristol Rovers, he went on to score 18 goals and finished as the club's leading scorer for the season.

2012–13 season
Harrold started the season with goals against Royal Marines, Tamworth, Paulton Rovers and Coventry City in pre-season friendly matches.

On 21 August 2012, Harrold scored his first goal in the 2012–13 season for Bristol Rovers, in a 1–1 draw away at Barnet. On 15 September 2012 in a 4–0 loss against Gillingham, Harrold sustained a severe knee injury and was unlikely to feature in any more games in 2012–13 season for Bristol Rovers. However, Harrold made a substitute appearance in the final game of the season against Torquay, scoring in the last minute, to the delight of Rovers fans, players and staff.

Crawley Town
On 27 June 2014, Harrold joined League One side Crawley Town after impressing manager John Gregory while playing for Rovers against Crawley in the FA Cup the previous season.

2014–15 season
Harrold made his first appearance for the club on 30 August 2014, coming on as a 77th minute substitute for Gwion Edwards away at Milton Keynes Dons. He scored his first goal for Crawley on 18 October 2014; a 55th-minute strike in a 5–3 defeat at Notts County. In a 2–2 draw at home to Milton Keynes Dons on 10 January 2015, Harrold played 50 minutes in goal following Crawley goalkeeper Brian Jensen dislocating his finger. Despite conceding a last-minute equaliser, Harrold won the Man of the Match award. After the match, Harrold told BBC Surrey "I've never played in goal before. Not even in training. I got pressured into it because everyone just looked at me and said 'you're big'. It's a bit embarrassing because it's my first man of the match for the club."

In his first season at Crawley, he made 23 appearances for the club, scoring once.

Cambridge United (loan)
On 23 February 2015, Harrold joined League Two side Cambridge United on a loan until the end of the season. He scored once in 7 appearances for Cambridge.

2015–16 season
Harrold scored his first goal of the 2015–16 for Crawley on 29 September 2015, scoring Crawley's third of the match in a 3–0 win at Newport County. He suffered a knee injury in April 2016, ruling him out for the rest of the season. Harrold made 39 appearances in all competitions, scoring 9 times. Harrold signed a new one-year contract in June 2016, keeping him at the club until the summer of 2017.

2016–17 season
Following a long recovery from his knee injury, Harrold suffered an Achilles tendon injury in September 2016. Harrold suffered a second Achilles tendon injury in December 2016, ruling him out for the following three months. Following the sacking of Dermot Drummy in May 2017, Harold was placed in caretaker charge of Crawley for their final game of the season. In the 2016–17, Harrold made 15 appearances, scoring once. He signed a one-year contract extension in June 2017.

2017–18 season
Harrold made two league appearances for Crawley prior to his transfer to Leyton Orient. Upon signing for Leyton Orient, Harrold told the club's website "I would just like to thank everyone at Crawley Town for the past three seasons, I have loved playing for the club."

Leyton Orient
On 31 August 2017, Harrold signed for Leyton Orient on a two-year deal following three seasons at Crawley. He made his debut for the club 2 days later in a 4–1 home victory over Guiseley in which Harrold headed in the third for Orient with Macauley Bonne grabbing a hat-trick.

Coaching career
In August 2020, Harrold joined the coaching staff at Leyton Orient, putting an end to his playing career.

On 23 February 2022, following the sacking of first-team manager Kenny Jackett, Harrold was made interim manager of Leyton Orient, assisted by academy manager Brian Saah. His first match in caretaker charge saw his side lose at home to fellow relegation battlers Carlisle United, leaving the O's just three points clear of the relegation zone. On 9 March 2022, the permanent appointment of Richie Wellens was announced with Harrold returning to his original role in the coaching set-up.

Style of play
Former manager Paul Buckle said "He is strong, and solid target man but he is also good with the ball into his feet - he is a class act", whilst his manager at Crawley, Dermot Drummy, stated that Harrold could 'handle himself physically', and that his touch and positional and team play is 'excellent'.

Career statistics

Honours
Wycombe Wanderers
League Two promotion: 2008–09

Leyton Orient
National League: 2018–19
FA Trophy runner-up: 2018–19

References

External links

1984 births
Living people
Footballers from Leyton
English footballers
Association football forwards
Southend United F.C. players
Grays Athletic F.C. players
Wingate & Finchley F.C. players
Harlow Town F.C. players
Brentford F.C. players
Dagenham & Redbridge F.C. players
Grimsby Town F.C. players
Yeovil Town F.C. players
Wycombe Wanderers F.C. players
Shrewsbury Town F.C. players
Bristol Rovers F.C. players
Crawley Town F.C. players
Cambridge United F.C. players
Leyton Orient F.C. players
National League (English football) players
English Football League players
Isthmian League players
English football managers
Crawley Town F.C. managers
Leyton Orient F.C. non-playing staff
Leyton Orient F.C. managers
English Football League managers
Outfield association footballers who played in goal
Association football coaches